Lovinac is a municipality in Lika-Senj County, Croatia.

Geography
The village of Lovinac is located 35 kilometers from Gospić to the southeast of the greatest Croatian karst field, Licko polje. At one time, the shortest trade routes from Lika's interior to the sea went through Lovinac.

The new highway which was recently built alongside the village has resulted in more tourism.

Population/Demographics
It has 1,096 inhabitants in the municipality, Croats make up 90% of the population.

Villages
 Gornja Ploča - 22
 Kik - 3
 Ličko Cerje - 117
 Lovinac - 288
 Raduč - 11
 Ričice - 114
 Smokrić - 55
 Sveti Rok - 292
 Štikada - 175
 Vranik - 19

Pilar (population 45) and Vrkljani (population 27) are hamlets near Lovinac.

History

Above the town of Lovinac are the ruins of the medieval city of Lovinac in which artifacts from the Roman period have been found. In the Middle Ages the village was under the control of the noble family Lovinčić. At the beginning of the 16th century it belonged to count Ivan Karlovic. The Turks conquered it around 1522. After the expulsion of the Turks in 1689 the current Bunjevac population was brought in to settle the area.

Economy

The production of clothes and underwear usually takes place during the winter months from prepared wool, flax and hemp. Some parts of the native costume, especially vests, are decorated with gold or silver coins and toka.  Also produced are type of local footwear called opanci.

Monuments and landmarks

 Old fort Lovinac
 Zdunić tower 
 Kovacevic kula: notable for its being the only building in Lika left over from the time of Turk occupation.  It is House 50 in Vranik.

Education

 Lovinac elementary school

References

External links

Municipalities of Croatia
Populated places in Lika-Senj County